Kirinji Kazuharu, real name Kazuharu Tarusawa (9 March 1953 – 1 March 2021) was a sumo wrestler from Kashiwa, Chiba Prefecture, Japan. He made his professional debut in 1967, reaching the top makuuchi division in 1974. His highest rank was sekiwake. During his long career he won several awards and set a number of longevity records. Upon his retirement in 1988 he became a sumo coach and elder of the Japan Sumo Association, until reaching 65 years of age in 2018.

Career
He made his professional debut in May 1967 at the age of just 14, joining Nishonoseki stable. At first he fought under his own surname of Tarusawa, before adopting the shikona of Kirinji in January 1974 upon promotion to the second highest jūryō division. The shikona had previously been used by one of his stablemates, ozeki Daikirin.

Kirinji reached the top makuuchi division in September 1974 and remained there for 84 tournaments, a record at the time second only to Takamiyama's 97. The run was not consecutive however, as he dropped to jūryō briefly in November 1979 after sitting out the previous tournament through injury. He fought in 1221 top division bouts in total, the eleventh highest in history. He spent ten tournaments at komusubi rank, the first in March 1975 and the last thirteen years later in January 1988, making him one of the oldest postwar sanyaku wrestlers. He reached his highest rank of sekiwake for the first time in July 1975 and held it on seven occasions in total. He never won a top division tournament but was a runner-up on two occasions, to Kitanoumi in September 1978 and to Chiyonofuji in March 1982. He won eleven sanshō, or special prizes, placing him joint tenth on the all-time list, and earned six kinboshi or gold stars for defeating yokozuna. His last kinboshi against Onokuni in May 1988 came just two tournaments before his retirement.

His spirited match with Fujizakura in May 1975 was particularly memorable and was enjoyed by the then Emperor Hirohito, a sumo fan. After fierce thrusting attacks from both sides, Kirinji eventually won the bout with an uwatenage, or outer arm throw. He was awarded the Fighting Spirit prize at the end of that tournament. The bout was later released on DVD as one of the "Best Matches in the 20th Century."

Retirement from sumo
Two days into the September 1988 tournament, where at 35 years of age he was the oldest in his division, Kirinji pulled out with a knee injury. He announced his retirement from sumo on the 14th day. He remained in the sumo world as a coach at Nishonoseki stable under the elder name Kitajin Oyakata. Although the stable closed in January 2013, the stable to which he moved, Matsugane, was renamed Nishonoseki stable in 2014. He reached the mandatory retirement age for coaches of 65 in March 2018 and left the Japan Sumo Association. On 13 April 2021, the Sumo Association announced that he had died of multiple organ failure on 1 March at the age of 67.

Career record

See also
Glossary of sumo terms
List of past sumo wrestlers
List of sumo elders
List of sumo tournament top division runners-up
List of sumo tournament second division champions
List of sumo record holders
List of sekiwake

References

1953 births
2021 deaths
Japanese sumo wrestlers
People from Kashiwa
Sumo people from Chiba Prefecture
Sekiwake